Crystal Palace Glaziers were a British speedway team that existed from 1928 to 1939.

History
They first competed in the Southern League in 1929 and were based at Crystal Palace Exhibition Grounds, Sydenham, South London.

The continued to compete in the Southern League until it changed to the National League in 1932 and won the London Cup in 1931, beating Wembley in the final. At the end of the 1933 season the team relocated to New Cross.

Crystal Palace open meetings were staged at various times in subsequent years until the Glaziers returned for the 1939 Speedway National League Division Two. However the team withdrew mid-season and had their records expunged.

The last speedway meeting at Crystal Palace was on Sunday, 13 May 1940 but did not involve the Glaziers.

Notable riders
 Tom Farndon
 Joe Francis
 Roger Frogley
 Ron Johnson
 Nobby Key
 George Newton
 Harry Shepherd

Season summary

References

Further reading

Defunct British speedway teams
Crystal Palace, London
Speedway teams in London